Uroš Rošer (born 27 June 1986) is a Slovenian football midfielder who plays for SK Kühnsdorf.

References

External links
PrvaLiga profile 

1986 births
Living people
Slovenian footballers
Association football midfielders
NK Rudar Velenje players
Slovenian PrvaLiga players
Slovenian expatriate footballers
Slovenian expatriate sportspeople in Austria
Expatriate footballers in Austria